Oh Young-hun (born 31 January 1969) is a South Korean politician serving as 39th Governor of Jeju Province since 1 July 2022. He previously served as member of the National Assembly from 2016 to 2022. Oh resignation as member of the National Assembly was accepted on April 29, 2022, due to his candidacy for the governor of Jeju Province in the 2022 local election.

Early life and career 
Oh Young-hun was born on 14 December 1968 in Namjeju County (now Seogwipo), Jeju Province. He graduated from Jeju National University.

Political career 
Oh served as a member of the Jeju Provincial Council from 2006 to 2011.

In 2016, he was nominated by the Democratic Party in the legislative election and was elected in Jeju City, Jeju Province.

References 

1968 births
Living people
People from Jeju Province
Members of the National Assembly (South Korea)
Minjoo Party of Korea politicians
Jeju National University alumni